Sofia Bano is a Pakistani former film actress and singer who starred in Lollywood movies mostly in supportive roles during the 1960s and 1970s. Her notable films include Ehsaas (1972), Gharana (1973), and Parday Mein Rehnay Do (1973). She won the Nigar Award for best supporting actress in 1973.

Early life
Sofia was born in Bombay in British India and she started working in films in early 1960s and did many supporting roles in Mumbai films.

Career
Bano came to Pakistan from Bombay, India, to work in the Lollywood movies in the 1960s. Her debut movie "Chhoti Behan" was released in 1964, in which she played a supportive role. In her next movie, Akelay Na Jana, she was offered a lead heroine role against the actor Muhammad Ali, but the movie couldn't get success at the box office. 1973 was the most important year in her career, as she signed two hit movies, "Gharana" and Shabab Kiranwi's Parday Mein Rehnay Do. In the latter movie, she performed a role of a proud and stubborn rich lady. Her last movie Zarurat was released in 1976 under the direction of Hassan Tariq.

Bano starred in 28 movies during her 12 years long film career. She also appeared in a Punjabi movie.

Personal life
Bano married Haroon Ahmed a businessman and politician of Pakistan Muslim League from Karachi with whom she has two children and quit the film industry.

Filmography

Film

Awards and recognition

References

External links
 

1938 births
20th-century Indian actresses
Pakistani film actresses
Indian film actresses
20th-century Pakistani women singers
Punjabi-language singers
Actresses in Punjabi cinema
Living people
Actresses in Hindi cinema
21st-century Pakistani women singers
20th-century Pakistani actresses
Actresses in Urdu cinema
21st-century Indian actresses
Nigar Award winners
Hindi-language singers
21st-century Pakistani actresses
Urdu-language singers
Pakistani women singers